Everyone's in Everyone is the second full-length album by singer-songwriter Patrick Park, released in 2007. "Life Is a Song" has achieved popular status through its use on the television programme The O.C. In "The O.C. - The Complete Series box set", Josh Schwartz has claimed that this song was his favorite musical choice of the series.

Track listing
"Life Is a Song" – 3:51
"Time for Moving On" – 3:45
"Here We Are" – 3:10
"Stay with Me Tomorrow" – 3:37
"Arrive Like a Whisper" - 4:11
"Nothing's Lost" - 4:30
"Pawn Song" - 3:40
"Saint with a Fever" - 3:08
"One Body Breaks" - 3:44
"There's a Darkness" - 3:22
"Everyone's in Everyone" - 3:38

Personnel
 Sera Cahoone - background vocals
 Don Dixon - upright bass, bass guitar
 Brandon Bush - strings, piano, Fender Rhodes piano, Mellotron
 Eric Heywood - pedal steel guitar
 Jennifer Condos - bass guitar
 Chris Stamey
 Joe Lester - vocals
 Chris Eubank - cello
 Lester Nuby - drums
 Patrick Park - vocals, whistling, acoustic guitar, electric guitar, 12-string guitar, harmonica, melodica, piano, celesta, Fender Rhodes piano, harmonium, organ, keyboards, drums, percussion
Also
 Don Heffington
 Alex Church
 Brian Aubert
 Christopher Guanlao
 Evan Slamka
 Kati Knox
 Kevin Houlihan
 Logan Matheny
 Mia Kirby
 Mika Terkela
 Sarah O'Shura
 Nikki Monninger
 Shannyn Sossamon
 Todd O'Keefe

References

External links
Patrick Park

2007 albums
Patrick Park albums